Sicyopterus calliochromus is a species of goby that is only known from the waters of the Tirawiwa River, which is a major tributary of the Wapoga River, which in turn flows into the eastern edge of Cenderawasih Bay, in the Papua Province in Indonesia.  This species can reach a length of  SL.

References

calliochromus
Freshwater fish of Indonesia
Taxa named by Philippe Keith
Taxa named by Gerald R. Allen
Taxa named by Clara Lord
Fish described in 2012